Brinay is a commune in the Cher department in the Centre-Val de Loire region of France.

Geography
Brinay is an area of farming and forestry, consisting of the village and five hamlets.

Population

Sights
 The church of St. Aignan, dating from the eleventh century.

See also
Communes of the Cher department

References

Communes of Cher (department)